Isabela State University is a public university in the province of Isabela, Philippines.  It is mandated to provide advanced instruction in the arts, agricultural and natural sciences as well as in technological and professional fields.  Its main campus is located in Echague, Isabela.

Milestone

The Isabela State University traces its beginning in December 1918 to a farm school – the Echague Farm School, constituting a four-room academic building and a home economics building established through the efforts of an American supervising teacher, Mr. Horatio Smith, under the provisions of the Compulsory Education Act.

With ten teachers to run the school, it accommodated 100 pupils from grades five to seven to take up elementary agriculture. Soon after, growth was gradually seen when the 100 students increased to 300, necessitating the hiring of more home economics teachers and a farm manager as was provided by the same provision. Subsequently, more infrastructures were gradually constructed in 1925 to include a modest library building, a granary, a poultry swine building, garden houses, and a nursery.

More developments soon followed with the conversion of the farm school into a rural high school in 1928. This progress provided for the opening of higher academic levels – the first and second-year classes, and the third and fourth-year classes thereafter. In response to increasing demands for appropriate higher education programs, the secondary agricultural education and home economics courses were made fully operational.

The year 1935 brought in another development for the Isabela State University when the Municipal Council of Echague, Isabela withdrew its support from the gradually progressing rural high school. Consequently, the school was transferred to Jones, Isabela where it saw the reverting of its status to a farm school again until World War II.

When the liberation period came in 1946, the farm school was named Isabela Agricultural High School and was relocated to Echague, Isabela. In 1952, it was renamed Echague Rural High School. As the course in forestry was integrated into the agricultural courses of the school in 1960, it was deemed appropriate to rename it as Echague Agricultural and Forestry School. Soon, the school began to gain recognition when in 1963 it earned the status of an agricultural school in the region. With the status came a broader sphere of responsibility as it was then expected to respond to the needs of its clientele not only in the provincial but also in the regional level. This seemed to have served as the cue for more innovations to follow.

More academic programs were offered as demanded by its regional school status supported by the timely reorganization of the administrative advisory structure of the newly created Bureau of Vocational Education which gave greater freedom to the agricultural, trade and fixture schools to plan and implement their educational programs. Concurrent with the agricultural school status, in 1970, the Echague Agricultural and Forestry School was also designated as the Manpower Training Centre for the region.

The filing of House Bill 2866 during the Seventh Congress of the Philippines continually elevated the status of the school. The bill made possible the conversion of the Echague Agricultural and Forestry School into a state college. The conversion move was approved by the Lower House on April 17, 1972 and was subsequently passed by the Senate on May 30, 1972. However, its presidential approval was made pending. But shortly after the declaration of Martial Law, the bill was finally signed and the now state college was named Isabela State College of Agriculture. With its new status, the programs in agriculture, forestry and home economics were expanded and engineering, agri-business and post-secondary two-year courses were opened.

The Educational Decree of 1972 promulgated on September 20, 1972 set another direction for the educational system. The decree declared a government policy to re-orient the educational system for an accelerated national economic growth and social development. During this time, the province of Isabela was also experiencing growth in many aspects. As the province saw the need to accommodate the results of its growth and respond to the call for national development through education, it felt the need to integrate and convert the institutions of higher learning into one effective and efficient state university. Presidential Decree (PD) 1434 then merged two state colleges- the Isabela State College of Agriculture in Echague and the Cagayan Valley Institute of Technology (CVIT) in Cabagan to become the Isabela State University. This also transferred the college level courses of the Isabela School of Arts and Trades in Ilagan; the Jones Rural School in Jones; the Roxas Memorial Agricultural and Industrial School in Roxas; the San Mateo Vocational and Industrial School in San Mateo. As likewise provided in the same decree, Echague campus is the seat of the administration. PD 1437 complemented PD 1434 by defining the composition, powers, and functions of the governing board which was amended by RA 8292 (Higher Education Modernization Act of 1997).

In 1999, the CHED Memorandum Order No. 18 s. 1999, which provides the guidelines for the integration of CHED Supervised Institutions (CSIs) to SUCs, was enacted. Pursuant to this order, the first CHED supervised institution that was integrated into the University is the Cauayan Polytechnic College at Cauayan Isabela in 2000. In 2002, another three CSIs were integrated into the system, namely: the Roxas Memorial Agricultural and Industrial School (RMAIS) with ISU Roxas Campus; the Delfin Albano Memorial Institute of Agriculture and Technology (DAMIAT) in San Mariano, Isabela; and, the Angadanan Agro-Industrial College (AAIC) in Angadanan, Isabela. With the enthusiasms of the Palanan and Santiago City Local Government Units (LGUs), the ISU and the said LGUs had entered into a memorandum of agreement (MOA) to establish extension campuses to their respective places. Palanan campus was established in 2004 while, Santiago City ISU campus last June 2008. To date, the university has 11 campuses grouped into four clusters strategically located in the four congressional districts of Isabela.

Past administrators
 FELIPE B. CACHOLA, Ph.D. in Agricultural Education (1978–1986). He was appointed as the university’s first president by President Ferdinand E. Marcos on October 6, 1978. His administration laid down the groundwork needed for a beginning yet fast developing university by promptly drafting the university’s philosophy, mission, goals and objectives and its strategy for growth and survival which has immediately provided direction to the university. He crafted strategies for effective educational management and development programs which elicited the needed loyalty and commitment to the University from his constituents. His conviction that the Isabela State University should not just be another university but one “that can touch and shape the lives of the people in Isabela as well as in Region 2” became contagious. For democratic and effective management, he organized a group of competent men to backstop him in the task of running a system composed of six developing schools.
 RODOLFO C. NAYGA, Ph.D. in Agricultural Education (1986–1999). He served as the second president of the university after his appointment on August 1, 1987. It was during his term that pioneering degree programs in Asia and the country, e.g. B.S.A. in Farming Systems, B.S. Agritech, B.S. Food Engineering, B.S. Development Management Education were established. He started offering doctoral programs major in: Agricultural Sciences, Occupational Education and Institutional Development and Management. He caused the delineation of 3.5 hectares of land which is now the site of the Ilagan campus. He was also instrumental in the construction of four buildings for the campus next to the Ilagan School of Arts and Trades campus. During his term, ISU was named the lead agency in establishing national (Agricultural Education Outreach Project, Environmental Development Program, etc.) and regional (Provincial Agricultural Institute, local government trainings, DA-DENR, etc.) programs and projects. Under his leadership, the University received recognitions in research in the national level (awarding of Dr Francisco M. Basuel as one of the six (6) Outstanding Young Scientist of the Philippines) and the regional level (creative research on Legulac Technology, PCARRD funded research project).
 MIGUEL P. RAMOS. Ph.D. in Education (1999–2003). He served as the third ISU President. During his time, ISU for one realized the need to align all facets of the academe to the new era. Despite financial setbacks and impending forced financial autonomy from the government, the university strived to take more insistent steps of filling resource gaps to meet its goals. His four years term was consequently focused on competitive instruction, timely Research and Development and Extension (RDE), and aggressive measures for financial stability.
 ROMEO R. QUILANG, Ph.D. At present the university is at the helm of the 4th University President. Dr Quilang provided the university with new policy directions and sets the new horizons for ISU to strive. To give ISU a boost in its administrative management, Dr. Quilang spearheaded the formulation of campus clustering breaking the long chain of onerous per campus management. To date, there are four clusters comprising the whole ISU system – the Echague cluster comprising Echague Campus, Jones Campus, Santiago City Campus and Angadanan Campus, Cauayan cluster consisting of San Mateo Campus, Roxas Campus and Cauayan Campus, Cabagan cluster comprising Cabagan Campus and Palanan Campus and Ilagan cluster covering San Mariano and Ilagan campuses. Another milestone in his administration is the formulation of the new University Organizational Structure which placed a better management system, timely in the increasing number of students. As a result, the ISU and their programs qualified to several accretion bodies like SUC Leveling, AACCUP and CHED. It was in 2006 that ISU became SUC level 4. Forestry program in Cabagan campus obtained Center of Excellence by CHED while, agriculture and agricultural engineering programs in Echague campus were qualified recently as Center of Development by the same institution. Most of the core academic programs of the university had gone to level 2 to 3 by the AACCUP.  Linkages became strong within and outside the country that helped the university perform better in its quadrangular functions such as instruction, research, extension, and production.

Organizational structure

The adoption of the new organizational structure is an initiative to implement better university management. Adhering to the principles of organization and management, the overall purpose of changing/revising the university organizational structure is to keep it attuned with recent developments and to streamline the institution to become more efficient, effective and economical in responding to the needs of its clientele.

The significant changes in the organizational structure are highlighted by the clustering of the university campuses. The eleven campuses were grouped into four constituent clusters in which component campuses (smaller campuses) are placed under each constituent campus, namely:  Echague Campus with Jones, Angadanan and Santiago City as component campuses, Cauayan City Campus with Roxas and San Mateo as component campuses, City of Ilagan Campus with San Mariano as its component campus and Cabagan Campus with Palanan as its component campus. The constituent campuses are headed by Executive Officers while the component campuses are headed by Campus Administrators.

The organizational structure (Figure 1) shows the different levels of management both in the administrative and academic levels. The Board of Regents (BOR) is the policy-making and governing board of the University under which is the University President, who is the Chief Executive Officer of the University.

Two major councils support the President – the Administrative Council (ADCO) and the Academic Council (ACO). The President chairs both councils. The ADCO reviews and recommends to the BOR for appropriate action policies governing the administration, management and development plans of the University while the ACO reviews and recommends the curricular offerings and rules of discipline of the university subject to appropriate action of the BOR. It fixes requirements for the admission of students as well as for the graduation and the conferment of degrees, subject to review and/or approval by the BOR through the University President. Supporting the Office of the President are the Presidential Management Staff and the Internal Audit Services.

Directly under the Office of the President are the four Offices of Vice Presidents for Academic Affairs, Administration and Finance, Research, Development, Extension and Training and Planning and Development. Also directly under the President are the four Executive Officers of each constituent campus/cluster under which are the deans and campus administrators.

The colleges, institutes and schools constitute the academic units of the University and are headed by the deans. The deans report directly to their respective Executive Officers. Associate Deans of Colleges/Schools/Institutes report directly to the deans concerned on matters pertaining to academic policies and programs. Departments of academic units are headed by the Chairmen who report directly to their respective Deans or Associate Deans.

Academic programs

Main Campus (Echague)
Graduate Studies 
 Ph.D. in Agricultural Sciences
 Major in: Crop Science and Animal Science 
 Ph.D. in Community Development
 Ph.D. in Institutional Development and Management
 Doctor of Public Administration
 Ph.D. in Occupational Education 
 Master of Science in Agricultural Sciences
 Major in: Crop Science and Animal Science 
 Master of Science
 Major in: Mathematics Education, Biology Education, and Chemistry Education 
 Master of Arts in Teaching / MAEd
 Major in: Chemistry, Biology, Mathematics and English
 Master of Arts in Psychology
 Master in Biology
 Master in Chemistry
 Master in English
 Master in Mathematics
 Master in Psychology
 Master of Science in Science Education 
 Master in Public Administration
 Master in Business Administration 
 Master of Arts / Science in Development Management Education
 Master of Science in Agricultural Engineering
 Master of Arts in Teaching / MAEd
 Major in: Filipino, Home Technology, and Social Science
Undergraduate Programs
 Doctor of Veterinary Medicine 
 Bachelor of Science in Agricultural Engineering
 Bachelor of Science in Chemical Engineering
 Bachelor of Science in Civil Engineering
 Bachelor of Science in Food Engineering
 Bachelor of Science in Information Technology
 Bachelor of Science in Information Technology – Ladderized
 Bachelor of Science in Animal Husbandry
 Bachelor of Science in Agriculture
Major in: Crop Science, Soils, Farming Systems, Animal Science, Crop Protection, Post Harvest Technology, and Horticulture
 Bachelor of Science in Agri-Business
 Major in: Agri-Business Management, Economics and Cooperative Development
 Bachelor of Science in Fisheries
 Bachelor of Science in Forestry (first 2 years)
 Bachelor of Science in Rural Development
 Bachelor of Science in Biology
 Bachelor of Science in Criminology
 Bachelor of Science in Nursing
 Bachelor of Science in Mathematics
 Bachelor of Arts
 Major in: English, Psychology, Political Science, Peace and Security, and Mass Communication
 Bachelor of Science in Business Administration
 Major in: Human Resource Development & Management, Marketing Management, Management Accounting, and Business Computer Application
 Bachelor of Arts in Public Administration
 Bachelor of Science in Accountancy
 Bachelor of Science in Entrepreneurship
 Bachelor of Elementary Education
 Bachelor of Secondary Education
 Major in: English, Filipino, Technology & Livelihood Education, Mathematics, Practical Arts, MAPE, Social Science, Library & Information Management
Non-degree Courses
 Two Years Computer Programming
 Two Years Computer Secretarial 
 Associate in Agriculture

Cauayan City Campus
Graduate Studies
 Masters in Information Technology

Undergraduate Programs
 Bachelor of Science in Computer Science 
 Bachelor of Science in Information Technology 
 Bachelors in Laws and Letters
 Bachelors in Arts and Sciences
 Bachelors in Education
 Bachelors in Hotel and Restaurant Management (Ladderized)
 Bachelors in Entrepreneurship
 Bachelors in Business Administration
 Bachelors in Agricultural
 Vocational Courses

Cabagan Campus
Graduate Studies
 Doctor of Education
 Doctor of Philosophy in Resource Management
 Master of Arts in Education
 Master of Science in Forestry
 Master of Science in Environmental Studies
 Master of Science in Development Communication
 Master of Science in Agriculture

Undergraduate Programs
 Bachelor in Secondary Education
 Bachelor in Elementary Education
 Bachelor of Science in Hotel and Restaurant Management
 Bachelor of Science in Forestry
 Bachelor of Science in Environmental Science
 Bachelor of Science in Development Communication 
 Bachelor of Science in Physical Education
 Bachelor of Science in Law Enforcement Administration
 Bachelor of Arts in Sociology
 Bachelor of Science in Criminology
 Bachelor of Science in Information Technology
 Bachelor of Science in Computer Science
 Bachelor of Science in Computer Engineering
 Bachelor of Science in Agriculture
 Bachelor of Science in Agribusiness
 Bachelor of Agricultural Technology

Diploma and Two-year Programs
 Diploma in Agricultural Technology
 Associate in Hotel and Restaurant Management

City of Ilagan Campus
Graduate Studies
 Master of Arts in Education
Undergraduate Programs
 Bachelor of Science in Electrical Engineering (AACCUP Level II Accredited)
 Bachelor of Science in Civil Engineering (AACCUP Level II Accredited)
 Bachelor of Science in Architecture (AACCUP Level I Accredited)
 Bachelor of Science in Industrial Technology (AACCUP Level II Accredited)
 Major: Automotive, Electrical, Electronics, Food & Service Management, Cosmetology, Drafting
 Bachelor of Science in Industrial Education
 Bachelor of Science in Psychology
 Bachelor of Science in Secondary Education
 Major: Mathematics, English, Physics, TLE
 Bachelor of Technology and Livelihood Education 
 Bachelor of Technical Vocational Teacher Education
 Major: Automotive, Electrical, Electronics, Food & Service Management
 Bachelor of Science in Information Technology (AACCUP Level II Accredited)
 Bachelor of Science in Nursing (AACCUP Level II Accredited)
 Bachelor of Science in Midwifery
2-year courses
 Computer Programming
 Computer Secretarial
 Diploma in Midwifery

References

State universities and colleges in the Philippines
Universities and colleges in Isabela (province)
Establishments by Philippine presidential decree